The initials PKR may refer to:

Codes 
Pokhara Airport, Nepal, by IATA code
 Pakistani rupee, ISO 4217 currency code
 Krotoszyn County, Greater Poland Voivodeship, vehicle registration

Entertainment 
 PKR.com, poker site

Organizations 
 People's Justice Party (Malaysia)

Science and technology 
 Pauson–Khand reaction in chemistry
 Parallel kinetic resolution in organic chemistry
 Protein kinase R, an enzyme